Jamesport is the name of two places in the United States:

Jamesport, Missouri
Jamesport, New York